The Bridesmaid is a 2004 psychological thriller film co-written and directed by Claude Chabrol. Its title in French is La Demoiselle d'honneur. The film is based on the 1989 novel The Bridesmaid by Ruth Rendell.

Plot
Philippe (Magimel) lives on the outskirts of Nantes with his mother Christine (Clément) who is a hairdresser and with his two younger sisters. One day, a local girl mysteriously disappears.  Soon after, Philippe's mother introduces her children to Gerard (Le Coq) -- a wealthy local businessman who appears interested in pursuing her. She gives him a sculpture of the Roman goddess Flora that had been in the family garden.

Not too long after receiving the gift, Gerard appears to vanish without a trace, presumably in order to avoid contact with Christine. Philippe makes it his mission to recover the sculpture. He finally tracks it down and places it in his closet without telling anyone. Later, at his sister's wedding, Philippe meets attractive bridesmaid Senta (Smet) and the two quickly fall for each other passionately. She claims to be a model and aspiring actress who lives in a huge villa which she says she inherited from her father.  The sexy Senta may be beautiful and irresistible, yet she also invents stories about herself and has macabre ideas about life, love, and death. As their affair intensifies, she asks Philippe to kill a stranger to prove his love. When he refuses, she kicks him out of her house, telling him he doesn't really love her. Philippe presents a news article about a dead tramp as proof that he has done the deed, and Senta, in return, tells him that she has killed Gerard. Philippe, not wanting to believe that she has really done it, goes to Gerard's house and finds that he is still alive.  Relieved that Senta is not a murderer, he gives her the sculpture of Flora and asks her to marry him. A police inspector informs Philippe that another man was killed at the same location, and asks Philippe to explain his presence there.  When he is released from the police station, Philippe calls Senta and tells her that they should break up. He then meets the homeless man whom he had claimed to have murdered, but whose reported death was a case of mistaken identity.

Philippe returns to Senta's house, and she confesses to him that she has killed a young woman who wanted to steal her previous boyfriend.  As the police arrive, Philippe tells Senta that he will never leave her.

Principal cast

Critical reception
The film was well received by critics. Website metacritic.com assigned a 74 out of 100 based on 20 reviews, indicating "generally favorable reviews."

Desson Thomas of The Washington Post:

Ty Burr of ''The Boston Globe:

References

External links 

2004 films
2004 thriller drama films
Films based on British novels
Films directed by Claude Chabrol
Films shot in France
Films shot in Germany
Films shot in Paris
French thriller drama films
2000s French-language films
Italian thriller drama films
French psychological thriller films
2004 psychological thriller films
2004 drama films
2000s French films